Sylhet power plant popularly known as Kumargaon Power Plant also known as Kumargaon Power Station is a gas turbine power station in Sylhet Sadar Upazila, Sylhet District of Bangladesh. This plant is operated by Bangladesh Power Development Board (BPDB). It has connected Sylhet district and some parts of Moulvibazar, Sunamganj, and Habiganj.

Structure
Kumargaon Power Plant is located at Akhalia, Kumargaon. It is a 132/33 KV transmission grid substation with two transmission line. One is 225MW, while the other is 20MW.

History
Kumargaon substation was built in 1967 with a capacity  of 13 MW. The Ministry of Power, Energy and Mineral Resources of Bangladesh planned to upgrade 150MW Sylhet Gas turbine power plant to 225MW Combined cycle power plant to generate more power using less gas. For this purpose, Bangladesh Power Development Board (PDB) has signed a deal with Shanghai Electric Group in 2009. PGCB has four 132/33 KV transformers at Kumargaon substation. Bangladesh Power Development Board also has two 33/11 KV transformers to supply electricity to the city.

See also

Electricity sector in Bangladesh
Energy policy of Bangladesh
List of power stations in Bangladesh

References 

Economy of Sylhet
Fossil fuel power stations in Bangladesh
Energy in Bangladesh
Electric power in Bangladesh
Power stations in Bangladesh
1967 establishments in East Pakistan
Sylhet District